The Northern European Gymnastics Championships is an artistic gymnastics competition for both male and female gymnasts from countries and dependencies from around Northern Europe.

Participant nations

Editions

References 

 
Artistic gymnastics competitions